Forensic video analysis is the scientific examination, comparison and/or evaluation of video in legal matters.

Forensic video analysis usage 
Forensic video analysis has been used in a variety of high profile cases, international disagreements, and conflict zones. Video forensics is necessary to show that images and videos used in court and media are verifiably true. Video forensics is especially important when media and governments use video coming from areas of state failure. Much of the video realized from inside Yemen and Syria have caused great political and public concern. Teams at the United Nation as well as within the governments around the world have utilized software and technical knowledge to ensure the information is accurate.

See also 
 Audio forensics
 Scientific Working Group on Imaging Technologies (SWIGIT)
 Video content analysis

References

External links
American Academy of Forensic Science (AAFS)
ENFSI Digital Imaging Working Group
International Association for Identification (IAI)
International Association for Pattern Recognition, Technical Committee on Computational Forensics (IAPR-TC6)
Law Enforcement and Emergency Video Services Association (LEVA)
National Technical Investigators’ Association (NATIA)

Video analysis